Alejandro José Acton (born June 3, 1972) is an Argentine professional racing cyclist.

Career highlights

1998
 1st, Stage 9, Vuelta Ciclista del Uruguay
2000
 2nd, Overall, Rutas de America
2001
 2nd, Overall, Vuelta Ciclista del Uruguay
2002
 1st, Stage 2, Rutas de America, Treinta y Tres
 3rd, Overall, Vuelta Ciclista del Uruguay
 1st, Stages 7 & 10 (Salto & Montevideo)
2003
 1st, Stage 6, Vuelta Ciclista de Chile, San Antonio
2004
 1st, Prologue, Stages 5 & 6 Tour de Korea (Seoul & Yang Yang (2x))
 2nd, Murraysville
 3rd, Somerset
2005
 1st, Stage 3, Green Mountain Stage race, Voler Burlington Criterium
 2nd, GP Mengoni
 3rd, Overall, Vuelta Ciclista del Uruguay
 1st, Stages 1 & 8 (Piriapolis & Trinidad)
 3rd, Athens
2006
 1st, Garrett Lemire Memorial GP
 1st, Bethel
 1st, Visalia
 2nd, Amgen Classic
 3rd, Kelly Cup
2008
 1st, Overall, Vuelta al Chana
 1st, Stage 3 (Cheveste)

External links

1972 births
Living people
Argentine male cyclists
Vuelta Ciclista de Chile stage winners
Cyclists from Buenos Aires